Felin Fach Meadows, Cwmgwili is a Site of Special Scientific Interest in Carmarthenshire, Wales.

See also 

 List of SSSIs in Carmarthenshire

References 

Sites of Special Scientific Interest in Carmarthen & Dinefwr